This article is a list of shotguns. Shotguns have traditionally fired iron, stone or lead shot stored in large shells that are normally loaded.

See also
Assault shotgun
Automatic shotgun
Combat shotgun
List of bullpup firearms
List of combat shotguns
List of multiple-barrel firearms
List of revolvers
List of semi-automatic shotguns
Riot shotgun
Semi-automatic shotgun
List of rifles

References

Shotguns
Shotguns